Norman Wesley Swan Bleanch (born 19 August 1940) is an English former professional footballer who played as a centre forward for Southend United and Bradford (Park Avenue).

References

1940 births
Living people
People from Houghton-le-Spring
Footballers from Tyne and Wear
English footballers
Association football forwards
Willington A.F.C. players
West Ham United F.C. players
Southend United F.C. players
Bradford (Park Avenue) A.F.C. players
King's Lynn F.C. players
English Football League players